Dame Athene Margaret Donald  (née Griffith; born 15 May 1953) is a British physicist. She is Professor of Experimental Physics at the University of Cambridge, and Master of Churchill College, Cambridge.

Early life and education
Donald was born Athene Margaret Griffith in London, to Walter Griffith and Annette Marian Tylor. She was educated at Camden School for Girls and Girton College, Cambridge. She earned a bachelor's degree in Natural Science (Theoretical Physics), followed by a PhD in 1977 for research on electron microscopy of grain boundary embrittled systems.

Research and career
Donald worked at Cornell University as a postdoctoral associate, where she switched from working on metals to polymers, before returning to Cambridge (Department of Materials Science) in 1981 and to the Cavendish Laboratory in 1983. She became Professor of Experimental Physics in 1998. Her major domain of study is soft matter physics, particularly its applications to living organisms and the relationship between structure and other properties.

Her research has applied microscopy, and in particular environmental scanning electron microscopy, to the study of both synthetic and biological systems, notably protein aggregation.

Further details of her research can be found in the citation for the Faraday Medal she was awarded by the Institute of Physics in 2010:

Administrative work
Donald was a Fellow of Robinson College, Cambridge from 1981 to 2014, when she became Master of Churchill College. She was a member of the ESPCI ParisTech scientific committee during that time. She is now an honorary fellow of Robinson College.

From 2009 to 2014, she was a member of the Council of Cambridge University. She is a member of the Advisory Council of the Campaign for Science and Engineering, and was appointed a Trustee of the Science Museum Group from 2011-16. She has been a member of the Scientific Council of the European Research Council since 2013. She chaired the Scientific Advisory Council of the Department of Culture, Media and Sports from 2015 to 2017.

Donald was the first chair of the Institute of Physics biological physics group from 2006 to 2010, and coordinated the writing of lecture notes in biological physics. From 2006 to 2008 and from 2012 to 2015, she was on the Council of the Royal Society, and from 2010 to 2014 she chaired their education committee. For 2015–16, she was President of the British Science Association.

As Master of Churchill College, in June 2021 Donald was involved in a dispute regarding the College's Working Group on Churchill, Race, and Empire.

Diversity work
Donald has been an outspoken champion of women in science. From 2006 to 2014 she was director of WiSETI, Cambridge University's Women in Science, Engineering and Technology Initiative, and she was the University's first Gender Equality Champion from 2010 to 2014.[23] Outside the University, she chaired the Athena Forum from 2009 to 2013, an organisation which aims to provide a strategic oversight of developments that seek to, or have proven to, advance the career progression and representation of women in science, technology, mathematics, and medicine (STEM) in UK higher education. She sat on the BIS (later BEIS) Diversity group, and serves the Equality and Diversity Board of Sheffield University and the Gender Balance Working Group of the ERC; she is a Patron of the Daphne Jackson Trust. She regularly writes on the topic of women in science in both mainstream media, and on her personal blog. She gives many talks on this issue.

She was awarded the UKRC's Lifetime Achievement Award in 2011, a Suffrage Science award by the MRC in 2013 and her portrait by Tess Barnes hangs in the Cavendish Laboratory. Donald talks about some of the issues for women in science in this video.

Awards and honours
In 1999 Donald was elected a Fellow of the Royal Society. Her nomination reads:

Donald has also been awarded the following:

 1983: Royal Society University Research Fellow (URF)
 1989: Boys Prize of the Institute of Physics.
 1994: Inducted a Fellow of the American Physical Society
 2005: Mott Medal of the Institute of Physics.
 2006: Bakerian Lecture of the Royal Society.
2009: L'Oréal-UNESCO Awards for Women in Science award. 
2009: Elected member of Academia Europaea. 
2010: Appointed Dame Commander of the Order of the British Empire (DBE) in the Queen's Birthday Honours. 
2010: Faraday Medal of the Institute of Physics. 
2011: UKRC Women of Outstanding Achievement's Lifetime Achievement Award in 2011.
2012: Honorary Doctorate of Science from the University of East Anglia.
2012: Honorary Doctorate from the University of Exeter.
2013: Honorary Doctorate from the University of Sheffield.
2013: Elected Fellow of the European Academy of Science.
2014: Honorary Doctorate from Swansea University.
2014: Honorary Doctorate from UCL.
2014: Rideal Prize Lecturer of the SCI.
2015: Honorary Doctorate from Heriot Watt University.
2015: Honorary Doctorate from Manchester University.
2015: Honorary Doctorate from Liverpool University.
2016: Bradford Global Achievement Award.
2016: Honorary Doctorate from University of Leeds.
2017: Honorary Doctorate from University of Bath.
2019: Lifetime Achievement Award from THE.

Personal life
Donald has been married to mathematician Matthew J. Donald since 1976; the couple have two children, a son and a daughter.

References

External links 
 
 Royal Society profile
 Athene Donald. Athene Donald’s Blog - Occam's Typewriter
 Guardian profile
The Papers of Dame Athene Donald held at Churchill Archives Centre

1953 births
Living people
British women physicists
Dames Commander of the Order of the British Empire
Fellows of Girton College, Cambridge
Fellows of Robinson College, Cambridge
Fellows of the American Physical Society
Female Fellows of the Royal Society
Place of birth missing (living people)
People educated at Camden School for Girls
Alumni of Girton College, Cambridge
Masters of Churchill College, Cambridge
Fellows of the Royal Society
L'Oréal-UNESCO Awards for Women in Science laureates
21st-century British scientists
Scientists from London